Sandra Bretting is an American novelist who writes mysteries. Her work includes a cozy mystery series for Kensington Publishing Corp. The series, titled the Missy DuBois Mystery series, debuted in 2016. She also is the author of a Christian inspirational book on prayer entitled Shameless Persistence: Lessons From a Modern Miracle. Other books include two hardcover mysteries published in 2012 and 2014 by Five Star Publishing, an imprint of Gale.

A graduate of the University of Missouri School of Journalism, she has written for several newspapers, including the Los Angeles Times, the Houston Chronicle and others. She belongs to Sisters in Crime and the Writers' League of Texas.

Books
Nonfiction: Shameless Persistence: Lessons From a Modern Miracle (2019)

Standalone Mysteries
 Unholy Lies (2012)
 Bless the Dying (2014)

The Missy DuBois Mystery Series
 Murder at Morningside (2016)
 Something Foul at Sweetwater (2016)
 Someone's Mad at the Hatter (2017)
 Death Comes to Dogwood Manor (2018)
 All Hats on Deck (2019)

References

Year of birth missing (living people)
Living people
American mystery writers
American women novelists
21st-century American novelists
Missouri School of Journalism alumni
21st-century American women writers